The Cathedral of St. Mary (Śānta Mariyā Āsana Dev Mædura) is the cathedral church of the Roman Catholic Diocese of Batticaloa in Puliyanthivu. The cathedral is a landmark  and Catholic historical icon in the district of Batticaloa, Sri Lanka. It was first built in 1808 by Paschal Mudaliyar.

It was co- cathedral under Diocese of Trincomalee-Batticaloa and became cathedral after the creation of Diocese of Batticaloa in 2012.

See also
List of cathedrals in Sri Lanka
Church of Our Lady of Presentation
Chandra Fernando (priest)

References

External links 
 Diocese of Batticaloa official site

1808 establishments in Sri Lanka
Churches in Batticaloa
Roman Catholic cathedrals in Sri Lanka
Tourist attractions in Eastern Province, Sri Lanka
Roman Catholic churches completed in 1808
19th-century Roman Catholic church buildings in Sri Lanka